Mitchell Geoffrey Bard is an American foreign policy analyst, editor and author who specializes in U.S.–Middle East policy. He is the Executive Director of the nonprofit American–Israeli Cooperative Enterprise (AICE), and the director of the Jewish Virtual Library.

Biography
Bard received his academic degrees from the University of California (UC): B.A. in economics from Santa Barbara, his Master's degree in public policy from Berkeley, and a Ph.D. in political science from UCLA. His dissertation was on "the limits to domestic influence on U.S. Middle East Policy". He was a postdoctoral fellow at UC Irvine from 1986 to 1987, researching the rescue by Israel of Ethiopian Jews from the Sudan, known as Operation Moses. Bard lives in Maryland with his wife and two sons.

Media career
Bard is a former editor of the Near East Report, the American Israel Public Affairs Committee's ("AIPAC") weekly newsletter on U.S.-Middle East policy. Before working for the AIPAC, he was a polling analyst for the George (H.W.) Bush for President Survey Research Group during the 1988 presidential election. He has been interviewed on Fox News, MSNBC, NBC, Al-Jazeera, The Jenny Jones Show and other media outlets.

In 2012, Bard attended the Israeli Presidential Conference.

Awards and recognition
In 2013, he was on the Algemeiner's list of the Top 100 People Positively Influencing Jewish Life for his work.

Published works

References

External links
 Mitchell Bard Home Page
 Articles at the Times of Israel 
 Will Israel survive? Interview with Bard (Campus Watch)
 Opinion pieces and articles on Fox News

Living people
Goldman School of Public Policy alumni
University of California, Santa Barbara alumni
University of California, Los Angeles alumni
University of California, Irvine alumni
Judaic studies
Scholars of antisemitism
Jewish American writers
Year of birth missing (living people)
21st-century American Jews